Alexander Brouwer (born 3 November 1989 in Leiden) is a Dutch male beach volleyball player. He is the 2013 World Champion alongside his team mate Robert Meeuwsen.

References

External links
 
 
 
 
 
 

1989 births
Living people
Dutch men's beach volleyball players
Sportspeople from Leiden
Beach volleyball players at the 2016 Summer Olympics
Olympic beach volleyball players of the Netherlands
Medalists at the 2016 Summer Olympics
Olympic medalists in beach volleyball
Olympic bronze medalists for the Netherlands
Beach volleyball players at the 2020 Summer Olympics
21st-century Dutch people